Carroll County is a county located in the U.S. state of Indiana. As of the 2010 United States Census, the population was 20,155. The county seat is Delphi.

Carroll County is part of the Lafayette, Indiana, Metropolitan Statistical Area.

History
In 1787, the fledgling United States defined the Northwest Territory, which included the area of present-day Indiana. In 1800, Congress separated Ohio from the Northwest Territory, designating the rest of the land as the Indiana Territory. President Thomas Jefferson chose William Henry Harrison as the territory's first governor, and Vincennes was established as the territorial capital. After the Michigan Territory was separated and the Illinois Territory was formed, Indiana was reduced to its current size and geography. By December 1816 the Indiana Territory was admitted to the Union as a state.

Starting in 1794, Native American titles to Indiana lands were extinguished by usurpation, purchase, or war and treaty. The United States acquired land from the Native Americans in the treaty of St. Mary's in 1818, which included most of the future county, and in 1826 the Treaty of Mississinewas made more area available for settlement. These two treaties resolved the occupation issue for the future Carroll County.

Whites had been living in the future Carroll County area since 1824 and their numbers increased rapidly in the next few years. Accordingly, Carroll County was authorized by the state legislature on 17 January 1828; it was named for Charles Carroll, the last surviving signer of the Declaration of Independence, who died in 1832. The first commissioners began organizing the county government on 28 April of that year, and determined to site the county seat at land donated by William Wilson. The name 'Carrollton' was first suggested for the new community, but at the suggestion of General Samuel Milroy, 'Delphi' was selected instead.

The Wabash and Erie Canal, built through the county in 1840 and operating until the early 1870s, is among the county's most significant historical legacies.

Courthouse
The first county courthouse was built in 1831. It was replaced by a brick structure in 1856. The 730-pound bell from the first courthouse was made in Cincinnati in 1836 and given by Sheriff Samuel Davis Gresham, and was used in the second courthouse until 1916. While the bell was in transit to Lafayette by boat, the boat sank. The bell was recovered from the Ohio River, and was sold, but was returned to Carroll County in 1967.

The current Carroll County courthouse was designed by Jaxson Cowell of Indianapolis, who also designed the Spencer County courthouse. It was constructed by A. E. Kemmer at a cost of about $250,000 from 1916 to 1917. The exterior is understated, but the interior is surprisingly elaborate, including a stained glass dome over a mosaic tile floor.

Geography
The Wabash River flows southwestward from Cass County through the upper part of Carroll County, exiting into Tippecanoe County. The Tippecanoe River flows southward through the county's upper west edge, also exiting into Tippecanoe County, where it merges with the Wabash shortly after leaving Carroll County's border. Wildcat Creek drains the south part of Carroll County, flowing westward into Tippecanoe to merge with the Wabash there.

The terrain of Carroll County was heavily wooded at the start, but now the flat areas are cleared and devoted to agriculture or urban development, with only the drainage areas still wooded. The highest point on the terrain ( ASL) is the county's SE corner.

Adjacent counties

 Cass County − northeast
 Howard County − east
 Clinton County − south
 Tippecanoe County − southwest
 White County − northwest

City
 Delphi (county seat)

Towns
 Burlington
 Camden
 Flora
 Yeoman

Unincorporated communities

 Adams Mill
 Bringhurst
 Burrows
 Carrollton
 Cutler
 Deer Creek
 Lexington
 Lockport
 Ockley
 Owasco
 Patton
 Pittsburg
 Prince William
 Pyrmont
 Radnor
 Rockfield
 Sharon
 Sleeth
 Terrace Bay
 Wheeling

Townships

 Adams
 Burlington
 Carrollton
 Clay
 Deer Creek
 Democrat
 Jackson
 Jefferson
 Liberty
 Madison
 Monroe
 Rock Creek
 Tippecanoe
 Washington

Major highways

  U.S. Route 421
  Indiana State Road 18
  Indiana State Road 22
  Indiana State Road 25
  Indiana State Road 29
  Indiana State Road 39
  Indiana State Road 75
  Indiana State Road 218

Railroads 
 Norfolk Southern Railway
 Winamac Southern Railway

Climate and weather

Government

The county government is a constitutional body, and is granted specific powers by the Constitution of Indiana, and by the Indiana Code.

County Council: The legislative branch of the county government; controls spending and revenue collection in the county. Representatives are elected to four-year terms from county districts. They set salaries, the annual budget, and special spending. The council has limited authority to impose local taxes, in the form of an income and property tax that is subject to state level approval, excise taxes, and service taxes.

Board of Commissioners: The executive body of the county; commissioners are elected county-wide to staggered four-year terms. One commissioner serves as president. The commissioners execute acts legislated by the council, collect revenue, and manage the county government.

Court: The county maintains a small claims court that handles civil cases. The judge on the court is elected to a term of four years and must be a member of the Indiana Bar Association. The judge is assisted by a constable who is also elected to a four-year term. In some cases, court decisions can be appealed to the state level circuit court.

County Officials: The county has other elected offices, including sheriff, coroner, auditor, treasurer, recorder, surveyor, and circuit court clerk. These officers are elected to four-year terms. Members elected to county government positions are required to declare a party affiliation and to be residents of the county.

Carroll County is part of Indiana's 4th congressional district and is represented by Jim Baird in the United States Congress. It is also part of Indiana Senate district 7 and Indiana House of Representatives district 24.

Demographics

2010 census
As of the 2010 United States Census, there were 20,155 people, 7,900 households, and 5,678 families in the county. The racial makeup of the county was 96.8% white, 0.2% American Indian, 0.2% black or African American, 0.1% Asian, 1.7% from other races, and 1.0% from two or more races. Those of Hispanic or Latino origin made up 3.5% of the population. In terms of ancestry, 29.7% were German, 14.7% were American, 12.6% were Irish, and 8.8% were English.

Of the 7,900 households, 32.1% had children under the age of 18 living with them, 59.5% were married couples living together, 7.3% had a female householder with no husband present, 28.1% were non-families, and 24.0% of all households were made up of individuals. The average household size was 2.54 and the average family size was 2.98. The median age was 40.9 years.

The median income for a household in the county was $47,697 and the median income for a family was $60,420. Males had a median income of $46,241 versus $29,541 for females. The per capita income for the county was $23,163. About 6.1% of families and 9.4% of the population were below the poverty line, including 11.0% of those under age 18 and 8.3% of those age 65 or over.

2020 census
As of the 2020 United States Census, there were 20,306 people

Education
Public schools in Carroll County are administered by the following school districts:
 Carroll Consolidated School District
 Delphi Community School Corporation
 Rossville Consolidated School District
 Twin Lakes School Corporation

High schools and middle schools
 Delphi Community High School
 Delphi Community Middle School
 Carroll Consolidated School

Elementary schools
 Carroll Elementary School
 Delphi Community Elementary School

See also
 National Register of Historic Places listings in Carroll County, Indiana

References

External links 
 
 Carroll Consolidated School District
 Delphi Community School Corporation

 
Indiana counties
1828 establishments in Indiana
Populated places established in 1828
Lafayette metropolitan area, Indiana